Kootenay was a federal electoral district in British Columbia, Canada,  that was represented in the House of Commons of Canada from 1904 to 1917.

This riding was created in 1903 from the eastern part of Yale—Cariboo riding, namely areas part of the Kootenay Land District, whose boundaries formed the federal electoral district boundary, and also defined the Kootenay provincial riding's boundaries.

The federal Kootenay riding was abolished in 1914 when it was redistributed into Kootenay East and Kootenay West ridings.

Members of Parliament

Election results

See also 

 List of Canadian federal electoral districts
 Past Canadian electoral districts
 Kootenay (electoral districts)

External links
Riding history from the Library of Parliament

Former federal electoral districts of British Columbia